Tom Milne (2 April 1926 – 14 December 2005) was a British film critic.

After war service, he studied English and French at Aberdeen University and later at the Sorbonne. Interested in the theatre too, he wrote for the magazine Encore, which existed for a decade (1954 to 1965).

Milne wrote for Sight & Sound, the Monthly Film Bulletin, The Observer and The Times during his career. During the 1960s he was associate editor of Sight & Sound and editor of the Monthly Film Bulletin. His book length studies of film directors include monographs on Joseph Losey (1968) and Rouben Mamoulian (1969) in the Thames & Hudson Cinema One series, the former comprising a series of extended interviews with the director. He also wrote a short study on the Danish director Carl Theodor Dreyer (1971) and edited and translated an anthology of interviews and writings on Jean-Luc Godard (1972).

In addition, Tom Milne oversaw the translation and subtitling of French films for television screenings. He was the founding editor of the Time Out Film Guide, which went through nineteen editions from 1989 through 2010.

References

1926 births
2005 deaths
Alumni of the University of Aberdeen
British film critics
University of Paris alumni
British subtitlers
20th-century British translators